Cosmopterix asiatica is a moth in the  family Cosmopterigidae. It was described by Stainton in 1859. It is found in India.

References

Natural History Museum Lepidoptera generic names catalog

Moths described in 1859
asiatica